This list of Australians imprisoned or executed abroad includes those cases where:

 the person was arrested and charged with or convicted of notable crimes whilst abroad.
 the person is an otherwise notable person in Australia.

Argentina

Bulgaria

Cambodia

China

Colombia

Egypt

Fiji

Indonesia

A prisoner exchange agreement is currently being negotiated between Australia and Indonesia.

Israel

Italy

Kuwait

Laos

Malaysia

New Zealand

North Korea

Singapore

South Africa (Limpopo)

Sri Lanka

Thailand

A prisoner exchange agreement exists between Australia and Thailand allowing prisoner transfers.

United Arab Emirates

United Kingdom

United States

Vietnam

See also
Anti-Australian sentiment
Department of Foreign Affairs and Trade (Australia)
Foreign relations of Australia
List of Australian criminals
Use of death penalty worldwide

References

 
 
Australians in international prisons
Prisoners
Prisoners